John Leake (1656–1720) was an English flag officer and politician.

John Leake may also refer to:
John George Leake (1752–1827), lawyer who founded the Leake and Watts Children's Home
John Leake (NAAFI manager) (1949–2000), English recipient of the Distinguished Service Medal
John Leake (American football) (born 1981)

See also
John Leak, Victoria Cross recipient
John Leek (disambiguation)
John Leeke